Xishan Township is a township in Bama Yao Autonomous County, Guangxi, China.

Administrative division
As of 2016, the township is divided into sixteen villages: 
 Fuhou 
 Hele 
 Bana 
 Nongyou 
 Jia'er 
 Gancahng 
 Lalin 
 Nongjing 
 Linlan 
 Kacai 
 Nongfeng 
 Nonglie 
 Nonglin 
 Polin 
 Qinlan 
 Gexian

Geography
The township lies at the northern of Bama Yao Autonomous County, bordering  Jiazhuan Town to the west, Bama Town to the south, Fengshan County to the north, and Donglan County to the east.

Economy
The region's economy is based on agriculture. Significant crops include grains and beans. The Bama miniature pig is a local specialty pig. The region also has an abundance of marble and iron.

Tourist attractions
Some sites of the Red Army are main attractions in the township.

Transportation
The G78 Shantou–Kunming Expressway passes across the township northeast to southwest.

References

Bibliography
 

Townships of Hechi
Divisions of Bama Yao Autonomous County